Young Widow is a 1946 drama film directed by Edwin L. Marin and starring Jane Russell and Louis Hayward. It focuses on Joan Kenwood, a young journalist who cannot get over her husband's death in World War II. Kenwood is reminded in large ways and small of her late husband during every one of her assignments. With The Outlaw still being withheld from general release, Young Widow was Jane Russell's debut.

Plot
Set during World War II, journalist Joan Kenwood (Jane Russell), whose Air Corps  photographer husband was killed on an air mission, returns to New York City from England. The managing editor of the newspaper for which she worked, Peter Waring (Kent Taylor),  offers Joan work, but she despondently rejects it and instead stays with two aunts on their farm in Virginia.  Unable to stop thinking about the death, however, she decides to return to New York.

On the train, young bomber pilot Lt. Jim Cameron (Louis Hayward) persistently tries to charm her, but Joan rebuffs him. In New York, both are unable to find vacant hotel rooms, but Joan calls her friend, Peg Martin (Penny Singleton), whose baseball player husband is serving on a submarine, for a place to stay. Peg shares her apartment with Mac (Marie Wilson), a show girl who has just returned from entertaining the troops.  A number of military men drop in on the apartment as Joan arrives, all invited by the scatter-brained Mac.  Jim learns where Joan is staying, shows up too, and sees opportunity in the situation. Later, everyone goes out to a café. While Jim and Joan are dancing, her husband’s favorite song is played, and a distraught Joan leaves. Jim follows and takes her home. When he bluntly suggests that she get over the man she is in love with, Joan explains that the man is her husband, who was killed over Berlin. Ashamed, Jim returns to his base at Mitchel Field on Long Island, where he is awaiting orders for the Pacific.

The next day, as Joan is leaving the apartment, she encounters a remorseful Jim. After she accepts his apology, Jim accompanies her to the subway. While waiting for the train, Jim saves the life of an elderly woman who falls on the tracks. Joan's reporter instincts take over, and she investigates the story and offers it to the paper. Delighted, Peter promptly puts her on the payroll. She and Jim pursue an easy-going courtship when he receives a 72-hour pass.

Jim receives a telegram ordering him to report for cholera shots. He proposes to Joan, but still haunted by her husband, she rejects him saying that "it will always be this way." A few days later, Peg’s husband returns after losing his leg in combat, and moved by seeing them together, Joan decides to tell Jim that she will wait for him. Peter drives her to the airfield, but Jim's outfit is already taking off. She waves frantically at him from outside the gate as he takes off, and as he passes by, mouths the words that she loves him and will wait for him.

Cast
 Jane Russell as Joan Kenwood
 Louis Hayward as Lt. Jim Cameron
 Faith Domergue as Gerry Taylor
 Marie Wilson as 'Mac' McCallister
 Kent Taylor as Peter Waring
 Penny Singleton as Peg Martin
 Connie Gilchrist as Aunt Cissie
 Cora Witherspoon as Aunt Emeline
 Norman Lloyd as Sammy Jackson
 Steve Brodie as Willie Murphy
 Richard Bailey as Bill Martin
 Robert Holton as Bob Johnson
 Peter Garey as Navy Lieutenant Smith
 Bill Moss as Marine Lieutenant Pearson (as William Moss)
 William Murphy as Army Lieutenant Hope (as Bill 'Red' Murphy)

Production
The film was originally directed by William Dieterle who left after filming began. He was replaced by Andre de Toth who then left reportedly due to a case of strep throat. He was replaced in turn by Edwin L. Marin.

The film went over budget by $600,000 and was a box office failure.

ReleaseYoung Widow'' was released March 1, 1946.

References

External links
 
 
 

1946 films
1940s war drama films
American war drama films
1940s English-language films
Films about journalists
Films based on American novels
Films directed by Edwin L. Marin
Films scored by Carmen Dragon
Films set in New York City
Films set on the home front during World War II
United Artists films
American World War II films
American black-and-white films
1946 drama films
1940s American films